Stefanos Pavlakis (born 1974), is a Greek filmmaker and writer. He has contributed vastly to the cinema of Benin by making critically acclaimed documentaries, The Eye of the Beholder, Studio Harmattan and Drive Through.

Personal life
In 2003, he completed a B.A. in Film & Photography at Edinburgh Napier University. Then in 2005, he graduated with an M.F.A. and later Ph.D. from the University of Dundee, Duncan of Jordanstone College of Art and Design.

Career
In 2009, he started collaborating with the two Berlin-based companies 'Expedere', 'The Story Factory' and produce short documentaries, advertisements and performative events.

Filmography

See also
 Cinema of Benin

References

External links
 

Living people
Greek film directors
Film people from Athens
1974 births
Alumni of the University of Dundee